Ministry of Sport and Tourism of the Republic of Poland was created on  by decision of the Council of Ministers under then-Prime Minister Marek Belka.

It was renamed on  when tourism was placed under ministry authority.

Ministry goals:
 Overseeing sport clubs
 Matters related to sport
 Matters related to tourism

State-controlled Polska Konfederacja Sportu (Polish Sport Union) became integral part of the ministry.

List of ministers

External links 
 Ministry of Sport and Tourism of the Republic of Poland official site

Sport And Tourism
Poland
Poland
Poland, Sport And Tourism
2005 establishments in Poland